Mary Josephine Lavin (10 June 1912 – 25 March 1996) wrote short stories and novels. An Irishwoman, she is now regarded as a pioneer in the field of women's writing. The well-known Irish writer Lord Dunsany mentored Lavin after her father approached him on her behalf to discuss with him some stories she had written.

Her subject matter often dealt explicitly with concerns of women, as well as a deep Catholic faith (she attended a convent school in Dublin). She is particularly noteworthy for her stories on the topic of widowhood, which are acknowledged to be among her finest. Her husband died in 1954, little over a decade into his marriage. She remarried in 1969. Her second husband, who before his marriage to Lavin had been living abroad, died in 1991 and she was once again a widow, remaining so until her death five years later.

Early life and career
Mary Lavin was born in East Walpole, Massachusetts, in 1912, the only child of Tom and Nora Lavin, an immigrant Irish couple. She attended primary school in East Walpole until the age of nine when her mother decided to go back to Ireland. Initially, Mary and Nora lived with Nora's family in Athenry in County Galway. Afterwards, they bought a house in Dublin, and Mary's father, too, came back from America to join them.

Mary attended Loreto College, a convent school in Dublin, before going on to study English and French at University College Dublin (UCD). She taught French at Loreto College for a while. As a postgraduate student, she published her first short story, "Miss Holland", which appeared in the Dublin Magazine in 1938. Tom Lavin then approached Lord Dunsany, the well-known Irish writer, on behalf of his daughter and asked him to read some of Mary's unpublished work. Suitably impressed, Lord Dunsany became Mary's literary mentor.

In 1943, Mary published her first book; Tales from Bective Bridge, a volume of ten short stories about life in rural Ireland, was a critical success and won the James Tait Black Memorial Prize for fiction. That same year, Lavin married William Walsh, a Dublin lawyer. Over the next decade, the couple had three daughters and moved to "abbey farm" which they purchased in County Meath, and which included the land around Bective Abbey. Lavin's literary career flourished; she published several novels and collections of short stories during this period. Her first novel The House in Clewe Street was serialised in The Atlantic monthly magazine before its publication in book form in 1945.

Widowhood and later career
In 1954, William Walsh died. Lavin, her reputation as a major writer already well established, was left to confront her responsibilities alone. She raised her three daughters and kept the family farm going at the same time. She also managed to keep her literary career on track, continuing to publish short stories and winning several awards for her work, including the Katherine Mansfield Prize in 1961, Guggenheim Fellowships in 1959 and 1961, and an honorary doctorate from UCD in 1968. Some of her stories written during this period, dealing with the topic of widowhood, are acknowledged to be among her finest.

Lavin remarried in 1969. Michael Scott was an old friend from Mary's student days in University College. He had been a Jesuit priest in Australia, but had obtained release from his vows from Rome and returned to Ireland. The two remained together until Scott's death in 1991.

In 1992, the members of Aosdána elected Lavin - now retired - Saoi for achieving "singular and sustained distinction" in literature. Aosdána is an affiliation of creative artists in Ireland, and the title of Saoi one of the highest honours in Irish culture.

Lavin's granddaughter is the novelist Kathleen MacMahon.

In March 2021 a public square, leading from Lad Lane, where she lived for many years, to Wilton Park, near the Grand Canal, was named Mary Lavin Place. It was the first time an Irish woman writer was so honoured.

Bibliography
Tales from Bective Bridge, Little, Brown, 1942; 
The Long Ago, Michael Joseph, 1944
The House in Clewe Street, Little, Brown, 1945; Faber & Faber, Limited, 2009,  (novel)
The Becker Wives, Michael Joseph, 1946
At Sally Gap
Mary O'Grady, Little, Brown, 1950 (novel)
A Single Lady, Michael Joseph, 1951
The Patriot Son, M. Joseph, 1956
A Likely Story, Macmillan, 1957; Literary Licensing, LLC, 2012, 
Selected Stories, Macmillan, 1959
The Great Wave, Macmillan, 1961
The Stories of Mary Lavin (Volume 1)
In the Middle of the Fields, Constable, 1967; Macmillan, 1969
Happiness, Constable, 1969, New Island Books, 2012, 
The Second Best Children in the World, Houghton Mifflin, 1972, illustrated by Edward Ardizzone 

The Stories of Mary Lavin (Volume 2)
The Shrine and other stories, Houghton Mifflin, 1977, 

A Cup of Tea

See also
 List of women writers

Notes

Sources
Bowen, Zack R. Mary Lavin, Bucknell University Press, 1975, 
Peterson, Richard F.. Mary Lavin, Twayne Publishers, 1978, 
; Wolfhound Press, 1997,

External links
 Mary Lavin at the Aosdána website
 Mary Lavin Papers, 1953–1964 at Southern Illinois University Carbondale, Special Collections Research Center
 Mary Lavin Collection, Binghamton University Libraries

1912 births
1996 deaths
Irish women novelists
Irish women short story writers
James Tait Black Memorial Prize recipients
People from Walpole, Massachusetts
Saoithe
20th-century Irish novelists
20th-century Irish short story writers
20th-century Irish women writers
People educated at Loreto College, Foxrock
American emigrants to Ireland